DMG Clearances, Inc is a company based in Hockessin, Delaware, USA, which handles music clearances and licensing for the entertainment industry. DMG Clearances was founded in 1996 by Deborah Mannis-Gardner.

The company clears musical compositions for use in films, video games, sampling and Broadway Theater. Clients include Drake, Coen Brothers, Martin Scorsese, Rockstar Games and The Roots.

Deborah Mannis-Gardner
Deborah Mannis-Gardner is a graduate of Emerson College and began her career in the entertainment industry working on music videos and providing television clearances in New York City in 1989. Mannis-Gardner went into the business of sample clearances for hip hop music in 1992 with a UK business partner. In 1996, she created DMG Clearances to focus on sample clearances and music placement.

Regarding the state of music sampling, Mannis-Gardner has always considered it an art. "I think sampling is an art and I think it's incredible. When I first started, I was told how it was theft. I was told that hip-hop and rap was a phase. That it wasn't going to be around. All of that horrible, negative stuff. I kept saying "well, a collage, that's not real art? Jambalaya isn't real food?" That's a great meal mixed up of different foods and spices, that's what sampling is."

Awards
The New Castle County Chamber of Commerce named Mannis-Gardner the 2016 Entrepreneurial Woman of the Year.

DMG credits

Film
Source: IMDB
 1997 A Life Less Ordinary (music clearances - as Debra Mannis-Gardner)  
 1997 Kiss Me, Guido (music clearances)
 1998 Velvet Goldmine (music coordinator - as Debra Mannis-Gardner)
 1999 Dogma (music coordinator - as Debra Mannis-Gardner)  
 1999 She's All That (music coordinator - as Debra Mannis-Gardner)  
 2000 O Brother, Where Art Thou? (music clearances)  
 2001 How High (music co-ordinator - as Debra Mannis-Gardner)   
 2002 8 Mile (music clearance)  
 2002 xXx (music coordinator - as Debra Mannis-Gardner)
 2003 The Fighting Temptations (music co-ordinator - as Debra Mannis-Gardner)  
 2003 School of Rock (music co-ordinator - as Debra Mannis-Gardner)
 2004 White Chicks (music co-ordinator - as Debra Mannis-Gardner) 
 2005 In Her Shoes (music clearances)  
 2005 xXx: State of the Union (music clearances)  
 2005 Are We There Yet? (music clearance / music co-ordinator - as Debra Mannis-Gardner)  
 2006 Rocky Balboa (music clearance)  
 2006 Littleman (music co-ordinator - as Debra Mannis-Gardner)  
 2006 Take the Lead (music clearances) 
 2007 Lucky You (music co-ordinator - as Debra Mannis-Gardner)  
 2007 Are We Done Yet? (music co-ordinator - as Debra Mannis-Gardner) 
 2008 The Accidental Husband (music co-ordinator - as Debra Mannis-Gardner) 
 2012 Hip Hop Cultural Odyssey: Know Your History (TV movie documentary) (music clearance - as Debra Mannis-Gardner)  
 2012 Be Inspired: The Life of Heavy D (documentary short) (music clearances - as Deborah Mannis-Gardner)  
 2012 Independent Lens (TV series documentary) (music clearance - 1 episode) 
 2014 Free the Nipple (music supervisor - as Debra Mannis-Gardner) 
 2016 Southside with You (music licensing)

Music
Source: Artist Direct
 1997	Forest for the Trees - Forest for the Trees (sample clearance)
 1997	Kiss Me Guido		(project co-ordinator)
 1997	Pop - U2 (sample clearance)
 1998	Men with Guns (Hombres Armados) [Rykodisc] (music clearance)
 1999	Classic Limited Edition - Made Men (sample clearance)
 1999	Life Story - Black Rob (sample clearance)
 2000	Old School - Next Friday(music clearance)
 2001	Forever - TKA (sample clearance)
 2001	Jealous Ones Still Envy (J.O.S.E.) - Fat Joe (sample clearance)
 2002	El Cool Magnifico - Coolio (sample clearance)
 2002	It Ain't Safe No More - Busta Rhymes (sample clearance)
 2002	Loyalty	Fat Joe (sample clearance)
 2003	Almost Famous - Lumidee (sample clearance)
 2003	Blood in My Eye - Ja Rule (sample clearance)
 2003	Chicken-N-Beer - Ludacris (sample clearance)
 2003	Grand Champ - DMX (sample clearance)
 2004	Concrete Rose - Ashanti (sample clearance)
 2004	Encore - Eminem (sample clearance)
 2004	Godfather Buried Alive - Shyne (sample clearance)
 2004	Hell and Back - Drag-On (sample clearance)
 2004	Kiss of Death - Jadakiss (sample clearance)
 2004	Lyfe 268-192 - Lyfe Jennings (sample clearance)
 2004	R&G (Rhythm & Gangsta): The Masterpiece - Snoop Dogg (sample clearance)
 2004	Southside - Lloyd (sample clearance)
 2004	The Pretty Toney Album - Ghostface Killah (sample clearance)
 2004	The Red Light District - Ludacris (sample clearance)
 2004	Tical 0: The Prequel - Method Man (sample clearance)
 2004	Urban Legend - T.I. (sample clearance)
 2004	White Trash Beautiful - Everlast (sample clearance)
 2004	Will & Grace: Let the Music Out! (sample clearance)
 2005	As Is. [CD & DVD] - Tocka (sample clearance)
 2005	Collectables by Ashanti - Ashanti (sample clearance)
 2005	Disturbing tha Peace - Disturbing tha Peace / Ludacris (sample clearance)
 2005	Roc-a-Fella Records Presents Teairra Marí - Teairra Marí (sample clearance)
 2005	That One Way - Czar*Nok / Max Julien (sample clearance)
 2005	The Anger Management Tour [DVD]	 (sample clearance)
 2005	The Black Rob Report - Black Rob (sample clearance)
 2005	The East Village Opera Company - The East Village Opera Company (sample clearance)
 2005	The Naked Truth - Lil' Kim (musician)
 2005	The Redemption, Vol. 4 - Ruff Ryders (sample clearance)
 2005	Welcome to Jamrock - Damian "Junior Gong" Marley (sample clearance)
 2006	A Girl Like Me - Rihanna (sample clearance)
 2006	Bred 2 Die Born 2 Live - Lil Scrappy (sample clearance)
 2006	Eminem Presents: The Re-Up - Eminem (sample clearance)
 2006	Food & Liquor - Lupe Fiasco (design)
 2006	Hoodstar - Chingy (sample clearance)
 2006	More Fish - Ghostface Killah (sample clearance)
 2006	N.O.R.E. y la Familia...Ya Tú Sabe - N.O.R.E. (sample clearance)
 2006	Point of No Return - Shareefa (sample clearance)
 2006	Press Play - Diddy / P. Diddy (sample clearance)
 2006	Tha Blue Carpet Treatment - Snoop Dogg (sample clearance)
 2006	Time Is Money - Styles P (sample clearance)
 2006	Year of the Dog...Again - DMX (sample clearance)
 2007	Baby Makin' Project - agged Edge (sample clearance)
 2007	Good Girl Gone Bad - Rihanna (sample clearance)
 2007	Hate It or Love It - Chingy (sample clearance)
 2007	Red Gone Wild: Thee Album - Redman (sample clearance)
 2007	Special Occasion - Bobby V (sample clearance)
 2007	Supply & Demand - Playaz Circle (sample clearance)
 2007	The Big Doe Rehab - Ghostface Killah (sample clearance)
 2007	The Cool - Lupe Fiasco (sample clearance)
 2008	Gutta - Ace Hood (sample clearance)
 2008	Nas - Nas (sample clearance)
 2008	Plastic Starfish - Tal M. Klein (sample clearance)
 2008	Rising Down - The Roots (sample clearance)
 2009	8dazeaweakend - Dallas Austin / Dallas Austin Experience (sample clearance)
 2009	Blackout! Vol. 2 - Method Man / Redman (sample clearance)
 2009	Certified - Unladylike (sample clearance)
 2009	Deeper Than Rap - Rick Ross (sample clearance)
 2009	Flight 360: The Takeoff - Playaz Circle (sample clearance)
 2009	Loso's Way - Fabolous (sample clearance)
 2009	Malice N Wonderland - Snoop Dogg (sample clearance)
 2009	Memoirs of an Imperfect Angel - Mariah Carey (sample clearance)
 2009	Notorious (original soundtrack)	 (sample clearance)
 2009	Rated R - Rihanna (sample clearance)
 2009	Relapse - Eminem (sample clearance)
 2009	Relapse: Refill - Eminem (sample clearance)
 2009	Ruthless - Ace Hood (sample clearance)
 2009	Tha Connect - Willy Northpole (sample clearance)
 2009	The Boss of All Bosses - Slim Thug (sample clearance)
 2009	The Last Kiss - Jadakiss (sample clearance)
 2009	Ultraviolet - Kid Sister (sample clearance)
 2010	Apollo Kids - Ghostface Killah (sample clearance)
 2010	Battle of the Sexes - Ludacris (sample clearance)
 2010	Crunk Rock - Lil Jon (sample clearance)
 2010	Donnie G: Don Gorilla - Sheek Louch (sample clearance)
 2010	How I Got Over - The Roots (sample clearance)
 2010	Loud - Rihanna (sample clearance)
 2010	More Malice - Snoop Dogg (sample clearance)
 2010	My Soul - Leela James (sample clearance)
 2010	Recovery - Eminem (sample clearance)
 2010	Reggie - Redman (sample clearance)
 2010	Rise Up - Cypress Hill (sample clearance)
 2010	Teflon Don - Rick Ross (sample clearance)
 2010	The Beginning - The Black Eyed Peas (sample clearance)
 2010	The Beginning & the Best of the E.N.D. - The Black Eyed Peas (sample clearance)
 2010	The Darkside, Vol. 1 - Fat Joe (sample clearance)
 2010	Wu Massacre - Ghostface Killah / Method Man / Raekwon (sample clearance)
 2011	Blood Sweat & Tears - Ace Hood (sample clearance)
 2011	Doggumentary - Snoop Dogg (sample clearance)
 2011	Hell: The Sequel - Bad Meets Evil (sample clearance)
 2011	I Love You (A Dedication to My Fans): The Mixtape - Jadakiss (sample clearance)
 2011	Lasers - Lupe Fiasco (sample clearance)
 2011	Talk That Talk - Rihanna (sample clearance)
 2011	Under the Mistletoe - Justin Bieber (main personnel, music clearance)
 2011	Undun - The Roots (sample clearance)
 2012	Food & Liquor II: The Great American Rap Album, Pt. 1 - Lupe Fiasco (sample clearance)
 2012	God Forgives, I Don't - Rick Ross (sample clearance)
 2012	Life Is Good - Nas (sample clearance)
 2012	Unapologetic - Rihanna (sample clearance)
 2012	Welcome To: Our House - Slaughterhouse (sample clearance)
 2013	#willpower - will.i.am (sample clearance)
 2013	B.O.A.T.S. II: #METIME - 2 Chainz (music clearance)
 2013	Break the Pot - Rich Boy (sample clearance)
 2013	Nothing Was the Same - Drake (sample clearance)
 2014	...And Then You Shoot Your Cousin - The Roots (sample clearance)
 2014	Hood Billionaire - Rick Ross (sample clearance)
 2014	Mastermind - Rick Ross (sample clearance)
 2015	Black Market - Rick Ross (sample clearance)
 2015	Fly International Luxurious Art	Raekwon (sample clearance)
 2015	Hamilton: An American Musical (original Broadway cast recording]) - Lin-Manuel Miranda (music clearance)
 2015	Living Legend - Gunplay (sample clearance)
 3 CD Collector's Set - Rihanna (sample clearance)

References

Music licensing
Sampling (music)
Arts organizations established in 1996
Companies established in 1996